"Patience of Angels" is the first single by Scottish singer/songwriter Eddi Reader released from her eponymous second album (1994). The song was written by Boo Hewerdine. It was released in June 1994 and peaked at number 33 in the UK Singles Chart.

Critical reception
Chuck Campbell from Knoxville News Sentinel wrote, "On the lilting and vibrant "Patience of Angels", she sings about a displaced soul searching for meaning in life amid feelings of anonymity (bottom line: most of us feel this way)."

Music video
The promotional video features Reader singing on the top deck of a bus.

Charts

References

External links
 Official web site

1994 singles
1994 songs
British pop songs
Songs written by Boo Hewerdine